Thung Fon is a district (amphoe) in the eastern part of Udon Thani province, northeastern Thailand.

Geography
Neighboring districts are (from the south clockwise) Nong Han, Phibun Rak, Ban Dung of Udon Thani Province, Phon Phisai and Sawang Daen Din of Sakon Nakhon province.

History
The minor district (king amphoe) Thung Fon was created on 1 July 1976, when the tambons Thung Fon and Thung Yai were split off from Nong Han district. It was upgraded to a full district on 21 May 1990.

Administration
The district is divided into four sub-districts (tambons), which are further subdivided into 36 villages (mubans). Thung Fon is a township (thesaban tambon) which covers parts of tambon Thung Fon. There are a further four tambon administrative organizations (TAO).

References

External links
amphoe.com

Thung Fon